The Ducal Crypt is a burial chamber beneath the chancel of Stephansdom in Vienna, Austria. It holds 78 containers with the bodies, hearts, or viscera of 72 members of the House of Habsburg.

History
Before his death at age 25 in 1365, Duke Rudolf IV had ordered a crypt to be built for his remains in the new cathedral he commissioned, and it has sheltered those remains for over 650 years. He also ordered a cenotaph for himself to be placed upstairs above the crypt, in front of the high altar. That symbolic tomb was later moved to the north choir and his epitaph written in secret symbols was placed on the wall of that choir.

The family of the ruling line of Austrian dukes was buried here after Rudolf IV, but after the dynasty became emperors they were buried in various cities (Vienna was not yet the settled seat of the emperor). After the Imperial Crypt at the Kapuzinerkirche opened in 1633, it became the new dynastic burial place.

Embalmers have known since the time of the Ancient Egyptians that it is necessary to remove the internal organs if the rest of the body is to be preserved. The containers with those organs were usually put in the coffin, but when the heir to the Imperial Throne, King Ferdinand IV of the Romans, died in 1654, he specified in his will that the container with his heart be placed in the Augustinerkirche, his body in the Imperial Crypt in the Kapuzinerkirche, and the urn with his viscera in the crypt at the Stephansdom. His instructions resulted in the foundation of the Herzgruft at the Augustinerkirche. His younger brother, Emperor Leopold I, pursued a tradition imitating that distribution of remains, and also enlarged the Imperial Crypt to make it large enough for additional future burials. The urns with viscera were thereafter regularly deposited in the Ducal Crypt in the Stephansdom. There are now 33 persons who are each buried in all three places.

By 1754 the small rectangular Ducal Crypt was overcrowded with 12 sarcophagi and 39 urns, so the area was expanded with an oval chamber being added (directly beneath the present location of the Archbishop's Throne) beyond the east end of the rectangular one. New sarcophagi were made for some of the bodies.

In 1956 the crypt was renovated and the contents were rearranged. The sarcophagi of Duke Rudolf IV and his wife were placed upon a pedestal and the 62 urns containing organs were moved from the two rows of shelves around the new section to cabinets in the original chamber.

Deposition in the crypt has not always been permanent. Emperor Frederick III lay here for only 20 years after his death, until his magnificent tomb upstairs in the south choir was ready. The body of his brother, Archduke Albert VI, was removed after 300 years.

The greatest influx, other that the regular arrival of visceral urns, came as a result of the Austrian version of the Dissolution of the English Monasteries under Emperor Joseph II in 1782. When the religious institutions holding bodies of some of the members of the dynasty were closed, they needed to be moved. The Imperial Crypt at that time had only half the space it has today, and already held 57 bodies. The emperor ordered that the bodies of two persons  who had died before the Imperial Crypt opened be brought to the Ducal Crypt instead. Another person, Empress Eleanor, would normally have been entitled to space in the Imperial Crypt, but because her husband was not buried there either, her body was sent to the Ducal Crypt.

It is probably around this time that the body of Duke Albert VI was removed to make room for others, and that the body whose sarcophagus is inscribed with only the year and name of the parents arrived. Identified through other evidence as one-year-old Anna of Lorraine, it is known that her brother Charles V, Duke of Lorraine married Archduchess Eleanora Maria Josepha (1653–1697) (widowed Queen of Poland and daughter of Emperor Ferdinand III) in 1678, and that marriage may have some connection with this non-Habsburg being brought here, but the exact reason is unclear.

The last item interred here is the urn with the viscera of Archduke Franz Karl, father of Emperor Franz Joseph, in 1878.

List of persons buried in the Ducal Crypt

The Ducal Crypt shelters the bodies of:

 "the handsome" son of King Albert I, father of Duke Albert II and grandfather of Duke Rudolf IV. His remains were moved here in 1782 when the Carthusian monastery he founded at Mauerbach, his original burial place, was closed during the anti-clerical reforms of Emperor Joseph II.
, second son of Duke Albert II and the 15-year-old brother of Rudolf IV.
 "the founder", eldest son of Duke Albert II. Rudolf commissioned the present cathedral, and founded the University of Vienna before his death in Milan at age 25. He was originally entombed in S. Giovanni in Concha and later moved to here. The University lays a wreath on his tomb every 12 March to commemorate its founding by him.
 wife of Rudolf IV and daughter of Emperor Charles IV. After the death of Rudolf she married Otto V, Duke of Bavaria.
 "with the pigtail", third son of Duke Albert II and younger brother of Rudolf IV. Died at age 46.
 son of Albert III. Died at age 27.
 oldest son of Rudolf IVs youngest brother, Leopold III.
 "the fat" younger son of Rudolf IVs youngest brother, Leopold III.

 infant son of Duke Albert V.
 Second son of Duke Ernest the Iron.
 9-month-old son of Emperor Maximilian II.
 15-month-old son of Emperor Maximilian II.
 one-month-old daughter of Emperor Maximilian II.
 Widow of King Charles IX of France and daughter of Emperor Maximilian II. In 1782 her body was moved here from the convent she had founded.
 young daughter of Duke Nicholas II, Duke of Lorraine, a former Cardinal.
 second wife of Emperor Ferdinand II. Her remains were moved here in 1782 from the Carmelite convent "Siebenbüchnerinnen" in Vienna that she had founded.

Gated niches in the original chamber (outside the entrance to the previous chamber) protect 62 copper urns containing the viscera (intestines) of various members of the Habsburg dynasty.

 Daughter of Ferdinand II, Duke of Tyrol and wife of her cousin Emperor Matthias who was 28 years older than her. She provided in her will of 1617 for the establishment of a crypt for her and her husband in a Capuchin's Church to be built in Vienna, and died only one year later, at age 33 after seven years of a childless marriage and is buried in tomb 1 in the Imperial Crypt she founded. Her heart is in urn 1 in the Herzgruft in the Augustinerkirche.

 Third son of Emperor Maximilian II. Once governor of the Austrian Netherlands, he wrested power over Austria, Hungary and Moravia from his inept brother Emperor Rudolf II in 1608 and inherited the rest in 1612. He died, age 62, only three months after his wife Empress Anna. He is buried in tomb 2 in the Imperial Crypt in the Kapuzinerkirche and his heart is in urn 2 in the Herzgruft in the Augustinerkirche.
 Eldest son of Archduke Charles II of Styria. He died at age 62. His heart is in urn 3 in the Herzgruft in the Augustinerkirche and he is buried in the Grazer Dom, Graz.
 Eldest son of Emperor Ferdinand III. He died two months before his 21st birthday. His heart is in urn 4 in the Herzgruft in the Augustinerkirche and he is buried in tomb 29 in the Imperial Crypt in the Kapuzinerkirche. He established the tradition of burial of different parts in three separate Vienna churches.
 Third son of Emperor Ferdinand II. He died during his 49th year and is buried in tomb 27 in the Imperial Crypt in the Kapuzinerkirche.
 Infant son of Emperor Ferdinand III. He is buried in tomb 6 in the Imperial Crypt in the Kapuzinerkirche.
 Son of Emperor Ferdinand II. Named at age 13 to take over his uncle Leopold's renounced see at Halberstaedt (when he became 22, this was confirmed by the Pope) and later became also Bishop of Olomouc, Bishop of Breslau, and Grand Master of the Teutonic Knights. He died at age 48. His heart is in urn 5 in the Herzgruft in the Augustinerkirche and he is buried in tomb 115 in the Imperial Crypt in the Kapuzinerkirche.
 Son of Emperor Ferdinand III and Empress Maria Leopoldina, who died during his birth. Bishop of Olomouc and Grand Master of the Teutonic Knights at age 13 as heir to his uncle, Archduke Leopold Wilhelm. The art collection he inherited from Archduke Leopold Wilhelm became the foundation of the Kunsthistorisches Museum. Died at age 15. He is buried in tomb 116 in the Imperial Crypt in the Kapuzinerkirche.
 Infant son of Emperor Leopold I and Empress Margarita Teresa. He is buried in tomb 7 in the Imperial Crypt in the Kapuzinerkirche.
26 (Heart of) Archduke Ferdinand Wenzel Josef.
 Infant son of Emperor Leopold I and Empress Margarita Teresa. He is buried in tomb 8 in the Imperial Crypt in the Kapuzinerkirche.
 Infant daughter of Emperor Leopold I and Empress Margarita Teresa. She is buried in tomb 10 in the Imperial Crypt in the Kapuzinerkirche.
 Niece and first wife of Emperor Leopold I at age 15, dead at 22. Her heart is in urn 6 in the Herzgruft in the Augustinerkirche and she is buried in tomb 20 in the Imperial Crypt in the Kapuzinerkirche.

 Infant daughter of Emperor Leopold I and Empress Claudia Felicitas. She is buried in tomb 11 in the Imperial Crypt in the Imperial Crypt in the Kapuzinerkirche.
 Second wife of Emperor Leopold I. Her 22-year-old body, by her own request, is dressed in the habit of a Dominican nun and is entombed beside her mother in the Dominican Church in Vienna. Her heart is in urn 24 in the Imperial Crypt in the Kapuzinerkirche.
 Infant daughter of Emperor Leopold I and Empress Claudia Felicitas. Her heart is in a gold and silver urn atop her mother's sarcophagus in the Dominican Church. She is buried in tomb 12 in the Imperial Crypt in the Kapuzinerkirche.
 Third wife of Emperor Ferdinand III. She was 56 when she died. Her heart is in urn 7 in the Herzgruft in the Augustinerkirche and she is buried in tomb 19 in the Imperial Crypt in the Kapuzinerkirche.
 Infant daughter of Emperor Leopold I. She is buried in tomb 14 in the Imperial Crypt in the Kapuzinerkirche.
35 (Heart of) Archduchess Maria Margareta
 Daughter of Emperor Leopold I. She died at age 23. Her heart is in urn 8 in the Herzgruft in the Augustinerkirche and she is buried in tomb 28 in the Imperial Crypt in the Kapuzinerkirche.
 Twelve-year-old daughter of Emperor Leopold I. Her heart is in urn 9 in the Herzgruft in the Augustinerkirche and she is buried in tomb 25 in the Imperial Crypt in the Kapuzinerkirche.
 Infant son of Emperor Joseph I. He is buried in tomb 33 in the Imperial Crypt in the Kapuzinerkirche.
39 (Heart of) Archduke Leopold Joseph
 Sixteen-year-old daughter of Emperor Leopold I. Her heart is in urn 10 in the Herzgruft in the Augustinerkirche and she is buried in tomb 16 in the Imperial Crypt in the Kapuzinerkirche.

 Second son of Emperor Ferdinand III and father of Emperors Joseph I and Karl VI. He reigned 48 years. He was involved in wars ranging from the defense of western Europe against conquest by the Muslims, to the War of the Spanish Succession to place his second son on the Spanish throne when the Spanish branch of the Habsburg dynasty died out in 1700. Leopold died a few weeks before his 65th birthday. His heart is in urn 11 in the Herzgruft in the Augustinerkirche and he is buried in tomb 37 in the Imperial Crypt in the Kapuzinerkirche.
 Son of Emperor Leopold I. He died at age 33 after a short reign of six years. His heart is in urn 12 in the Herzgruft in the Augustinerkirche and he is buried in tomb 35 in the Imperial Crypt in the Kapuzinerkirche.
 Prince of Asturias. Six-month-old only son of Emperor Karl VI. He is buried in tomb 30 in the Imperial Crypt in the Kapuzinerkirche.
44 (Heart of) Archduke Leopold Johann.
 Six-year-old youngest daughter of Emperor Karl VI. She is buried in tomb 23 in the Imperial Crypt in the Kapuzinerkirche.
 Three-years old, eldest daughter of Emperor Franz I Stephen and Empress Maria Theresa. She is buried in tomb 48 in the Imperial Crypt in the Kapuzinerkirche.
47 (Heart of) Archduchess Marie Elisabeth.
 Younger son of Emperor Leopold I. He died at age 55 after a reign of 29 years. His heart is in urn 13 in the Herzgruft in the Augustinerkirche and he is buried in tomb 40 in the Imperial Crypt in the Kapuzinerkirche.
 Third daughter of Emperor Franz I Stephen and Empress Maria Theresa. Died at age 1 year. She is buried in tomb 53 in the Imperial Crypt in the Kapuzinerkirche.
50 (Heart of) Archduchess Marie Caroline.
 Regent of the Austrian Netherlands. Daughter of Emperor Leopold I. Dead at age 61. Her heart is in urn 14 in the Herzgruft in the Augustinerkirche and she is buried in tomb 38 in the Imperial Crypt in the Kapuzinerkirche. The container here for her viscera is of an unusual form, being a flat box instead of the more usual pot shape.
 26-year-old daughter of Emperor Karl VI. Her heart is in urn 15 in the Herzgruft in the Augustinerkirche and she is buried in tomb 39 in the Imperial Crypt in the Kapuzinerkirche.
 Wife (1708) of Emperor Karl VI and mother of Empress Maria Theresa. Died at age 59. Her heart is in urn 17 in the Herzgruft in the Augustinerkirche and she is buried in tomb 36 in the Imperial Crypt in the Kapuzinerkirche.

 Second son of Emperor Franz I Stephen and Empress Maria Theresa. Died of smallpox shortly before his 16th birthday. His heart is in urn 18 in the Herzgruft in the Augustinerkirche and he is buried in tomb 44 in the Imperial Crypt in the Kapuzinerkirche.
 Eighth daughter of Emperor Franz I Stephen and Empress Maria Theresa. Died of smallpox at age 12. Her heart is in urn 19 in the Herzgruft in the Augustinerkirche and she is buried in tomb 45 in the Imperial Crypt in the Kapuzinerkirche.
 Duke of Lorraine and Grand Duke of Tuscany. Husband of Empress Maria Theresa, he died at age 56 after nominally being Emperor for 25 years. His heart is in urn 20 in the Herzgruft in the Augustinerkirche and he is buried in tomb 55 in the Imperial Crypt in the Kapuzinerkirche.
 Eldest surviving descendant of Emperor Karl VI,→Family Tree her ascension was contested and officially the crown of the Empire went to her husband (1736) Emperor Franz I Stephen. but she held Hungary and Bohemia as Queen in her own right. Dying at age 63, her forty years' reign is thought of by the Austrians as the British think of Queen Victoria: the golden years of power, prestige and empire. Her heart is in urn 21 in the Herzgruft in the Augustinerkirche and she is buried in tomb 56 in the Imperial Crypt in the Kapuzinerkirche.
 Infant first daughter of Emperor Franz II and Empress Maria Theresia. Her heart is in urn 22 in the Herzgruft in the Augustinerkirche and she is buried in tomb 66 in the Imperial Crypt in the Kapuzinerkirche.

 Third son of Empress Maria Theresia. →Family Tree Most of his career was spent in Florence, reforming the governance there as Grand Duke of Tuscany, and only his final two years were as Emperor. He died at age 45. His heart is in urn 23 in the Herzgruft in the Augustinerkirche and he is buried in tomb 113 in the Imperial Crypt in the Kapuzinerkirche.
 Originally contracted to marry Empress Maria Theresia's second son, Archduke Karl Joseph, his early death diverted her instead to the third son, who later became Emperor Leopold II. In the course of 21 years, she bore her not-always-faithful husband 16 children, among them Emperor Franz II, and Archduke Karl the victor of Aspern. Grieving for her husband, she outlived him by only two months leaving many small children.  Her 46-year-old heart is in urn 24 in the Herzgruft in the Augustinerkirche and she is buried in tomb 114 in the Imperial Crypt in the Kapuzinerkirche.
 Infant daughter of Emperor Franz II and Maria Theresia. Her heart is in urn 25 in the Herzgruft in the Augustinerkirche and she is buried in tomb 95 in the Imperial Crypt in the Kapuzinerkirche.
 Fourth son of Emperor Leopold II and Empress Maria Ludovika. Palatine of Hungary. Died at 23. His heart is in urn 26 in the Herzgruft in the Augustinerkirche and he is buried in tomb 64 in the Imperial Crypt in the Kapuzinerkirche.
 Favorite daughter of Empress Maria Theresia. Wife of Duke Albert of Teschen. The famous and moving monument he erected to her memory is in the Augustinerkirche. She died of Typhus at age 56. Her heart is in urn 28 in the Herzgruft in the Augustinerkirche and she is buried in tomb 112 in the Imperial Crypt in the Kapuzinerkirche.
 Daughter of Emperor Leopold II and Empress Maria Ludovika. Died at 18. Her heart is in urn 27 in the Herzgruft in the Augustinerkirche and she is buried in tomb 65 in the Imperial Crypt in the Kapuzinerkirche.
 Fourth daughter of Emperor Franz II and Maria Theresia. Died at 3. Her heart is in urn 29 in the Herzgruft in the Augustinerkirche and she is buried in tomb 87 in the Imperial Crypt in the Kapuzinerkirche.
 Youngest son of Empress Maria Theresia. Grand Master of the Teutonic Knights, Bishop of Münster and Elector-Archbishop of Cologne. Died at 45. His heart is in urn 30 in the Herzgruft in the Augustinerkirche and he is buried in tomb 118 in the Imperial Crypt in the Kapuzinerkirche.
 Daughter of Ferdinand III, Grand Duke of Tuscany and Luisa Maria Amelia Teresa of Naples. Died at 9. Her heart is in urn 31 in the Herzgruft in the Augustinerkirche and she is buried in tomb 79 in the Imperial Crypt in the Kapuzinerkirche.
 Daughter of Queen Maria Karolina of Naples and Sicily. First wife (1790) of Ferdinand III, Grand Duke of Tuscany →Family Tree. Died in childbirth at 29. Her heart is in urn 32 in the Herzgruft in the Augustinerkirche and she is buried along with her stillborn son in tomb 84 in the Imperial Crypt in the Kapuzinerkirche.
 Fourth son of Empress Maria Theresia. Governor of Lombardy and, later, the Austrian Netherlands. Founder of the House of Austria-Este. His 52-year-old heart is in urn 34 in the Herzgruft in the Augustinerkirche and he is buried in tomb 105 in the Imperial Crypt in the Kapuzinerkirche.
 Second wife (1790) at age 18 of Emperor Franz II. Mother of Empress Maria Louise (second wife of Napoleon), Emperor Ferdinand, and all subsequent children of her husband. Because her mother was a sister of her husband's father the couple were first cousins. →Family Tree (ancestors) She died at age 34 of tuberculous pleurisy. Her heart is in urn 35 in the Herzgruft in the Augustinerkirche and she is buried in tomb 60 in the Imperial Crypt in the Kapuzinerkirche.
 Second son of Emperor Franz II and Empress Maria Theresia. Died at 18. His heart is in urn 36 in the Herzgruft in the Augustinerkirche and he is buried in tomb 69 in the Imperial Crypt in the Kapuzinerkirche.
 Fourth son of Emperor Franz II and Empress Maria Theresia. Died at 4. His heart is in urn 37 in the Herzgruft in the Augustinerkirche and he is buried in tomb 71 in the Imperial Crypt in the Kapuzinerkirche.
 Daughter of Empress Maria Theresia. Wife of King Ferdinand I of the Two Sicilies. Her heart is in urn 38 in the Herzgruft in the Augustinerkirche and she is buried in tomb 107 in the Imperial Crypt in the Kapuzinerkirche.

 Third wife (1808) at age 20 of 40-year-old cousin Emperor Franz II, she contracted tuberculosis shortly after their wedding, suffering from it for the eight years of marriage before dying at age 28. Her heart is in urn 39 in the Herzgruft in the Augustinerkirche and she is buried in tomb 58 in the Imperial Crypt in the Kapuzinerkirche.
 Husband of Archduchess Maria Christina. The Albertina museum, in his former palace, is named for him because his collection of paintings formed the nucleus of the museum. The oldest of those represented here, he died at age 84. His heart is in urn 40 in the Herzgruft in the Augustinerkirche and he is buried in tomb 111 in the Imperial Crypt in the Kapuzinerkirche.
 Twenty-one-year-old son of Napoléon Bonaparte and Empress Maria Louise (daughter of Emperor Franz II.) His heart is in urn 42 in the Herzgruft in the Augustinerkirche. His body was originally buried in the Imperial Crypt in the Kapuzinerkirche but in 1940, on the orders of Adolf Hitler, it was moved to Les Invalides in Paris to rest with his father's.
 First son of Emperor Franz II. Mentally retarded, he abdicated after a nominal reign of 12 years and spent the remainder of his 82-year-long life in Prague. His heart is in urn 53 in the Herzgruft in the Augustinerkirche and he is buried in tomb 62 in the Imperial Crypt in the Kapuzinerkirche.
 Third son of Emperor Franz II. When his elder brother Emperor Ferdinand abdicated in 1848, he stood aside so that his son, Emperor Franz Joseph, could succeed to the throne instead. Great grandfather of the last reigning emperor, Emperor Karl I.  Aged 76 when he died, his viscera are the last interred here, and his heart was the last to be placed in the Herzgruft in the Augustinerkirche, where it occupies urn 54.  He is buried in tomb 135 in the Imperial Crypt in the Kapuzinerkirche.

See also
Imperial Crypt
Herzgruft

References
  (in German)
 

Buildings and structures in Innere Stadt
Tourist attractions in Vienna
Cemeteries in Vienna
Sarcophagi
Burial sites of the House of Habsburg
St. Stephen's Cathedral, Vienna